

Universities
Haryana, India has at least 61 functional universities, including eight central university (five Institutes of National Importance (INI), one AIIMS, two general universities and one deemed university), 22 state universities, two public universities, eight deemed universities (four public and four private) and 21 private universities. Many more universities that have been announced or planned, but not yet functional, are not included here.

 granted deemed university status

Colleges

Engineering Colleges/Institutes

Govt. Engineering Colleges/Institutes

Private Engineering Colleges/Institutes

Education & Research Colleges/Institutes

Government Education & Research Colleges/Institutes

Polytechnics

Govt. Polytechnic Institutes

See also

 Rajiv Gandhi Education City, Sonipat
 Haryana Board of School Education
 State Counselling Board, Haryana
 List of universities in India

References

H
Haryana-related lists